David Dason Loverne (born May 22, 1976) is a former American football guard. He was drafted by the New York Jets in the third round of the 1999 NFL Draft. He played college football at Idaho.

Loverne was also a member of the Washington Redskins, St. Louis Rams, Detroit Lions and Houston Texans.

Early years
Loverne did not begin playing football until high school after his mother reportedly insisted he take up sports in order to stay out of trouble.  His football team, De La Salle High School, was named national champion in five different years on a winning streak which began when Loverne played there as an offensive and defensive lineman his junior year.  lineman.

Professional career
Loverne first entered the NFL as third-round draft selection (90th overall) by the New York Jets in 1999 NFL Draft.

David Loverne was inactive for the entire season but did play on special teams for the next 2 years- even getting in some O-Line rotational duty in 2001 to complement the team- even playing a series at Fullback (blocking) vs the Colts.

The Redskins acquired him from the New York Jets on April 8, 2002 to swap 5th round picks (154th for 160th).

Loverne started at left guard in the season opener in 2002, and played in fifteen of the regular season games that year, starting in eleven of them.  He was hampered with a quad injury during week 6.  On March 1, 2003, he was traded to the St. Louis Rams for running back Trung Canidate and a 2003 fourth-round pick.

References
 NFL Draft 1999 profile: David Loverne provided by CNN Sports Illustrated

1976 births
American football offensive linemen
Detroit Lions players
Houston Texans players
Idaho Vandals football players
Living people
New York Jets players
People from Concord, California
San Jose State Spartans football players
St. Louis Rams players
Washington Redskins players
Players of American football from San Jose, California
De La Salle High School (Concord, California) alumni